The Association for Women Journalists is a professional organization to support women working in the journalism field, and girls who aspire to the field.

The first Association for Women Journalists chapter was founded in 1988 in Dallas-Fort Worth, Texas.

Association for Women Journalists' Chicago chapter was later founded in 1993 and fashioned after the Dallas-Ft. Worth group. The chapter's initial meeting was held at Northwestern University's Medill School of Journalism.

References

Women's organizations based in the United States
Journalism-related professional associations
History of women in Texas